Henry Hopkins (November 30, 1837 – August 18, 1908) was an American Congregationalist pastor and president of Williams College.

Life and career
Henry Hopkins was born in Williamstown, Massachusetts on November 30, 1837, the son of Mark Hopkins. He grew up in Williamstown and graduated from Williams College in 1858, where he was a member of The Kappa Alpha Society. He studied theology at Union Seminary and was ordained as a minister in 1861.

Hopkins became president of Williams in 1902, following the service of acting president John Haskell Hewitt, and served until his planned retirement in 1908. He died of pneumonia on August 18, 1908, shortly after retiring while traveling in Rotterdam.

References

External links
Henry Hopkins biography via Williams College
Henry Hopkins papers at Williams College Archives & Special Collections 

1837 births
1908 deaths
American Christian clergy
People from Williamstown, Massachusetts
Presidents of Williams College
Williams College alumni
19th-century American clergy